Terminus Côte-Vertu is an Exo bus terminus partly north and partly south of the Côte-Vertu Metro station. It is located in the borough of Saint-Laurent in Montreal, Quebec, Canada.

Before this new terminus was built, all bus stops were located on the streets near the Metro station entrances. This created a lot of traffic jams on Côte-Vertu and Decarie boulevards. The buses heading to the West Island were inconveniently located at the Edouard-Laurin street entrance. The southern portion of the terminus occupies part of what was once the Edouard-Laurin Streetcar Terminus.

Connecting bus routes
North site platforms are used exclusively by Société de transport de Montréal (STM) buses, with the remainder of the STM routes using curb side bus stops on Côte-Vertu Boulevard, Decarie Boulevard and Gohier Street. The south site is used by Société de transport de Laval (STL) and La Presqu'Île sector buses.
With the reopening of the Cote-Vertu Station , lines STM 64, STM 470 and STM 968 were cut back and relocated to Cote-Vertu Station.
STL does not provide service on journeys entirely within Montreal. Buses coming from Laval will drop off but cannot pick up passengers within Montreal, and on returning trips passengers can board in Montreal but will not be allowed to descend until reaching Laval.

Nearby points of interest

References

External links
 Côte-Vertu Metro Station Neighbourhood map
 STL 2011 map 
 STL Schedules

Exo bus stations
Saint-Laurent, Quebec